Gunpowder tea (pronounced ) is a form of tea in which each leaf has been rolled into a small round pellet. Its English name comes from its resemblance to grains of gunpowder.  This rolling method of shaping tea is most often applied either to dried green tea (the most commonly encountered variety outside China) or oolong tea.

Gunpowder tea production dates back to the Tang Dynasty 618–907. It was first introduced to Taiwan in the nineteenth century. Gunpowder tea leaves are withered, steamed, rolled, and then dried. Although the individual leaves were formerly rolled by hand, today all but the highest grade gunpowder teas are rolled by machines. Rolling renders the leaves less susceptible to physical damage and breakage and allows them to retain more of their flavor and aroma. In addition, it allows certain types of oolong teas to be aged for decades if they are cared for by being occasionally roasted.

Shiny pellets indicate that the tea is relatively fresh. Pellet size is also associated with quality, larger pellets being considered a mark of lower quality tea. High quality gunpowder tea will have small, tightly rolled pellets. The tea is divided into several grades using a combination of numbers and letters. As an example, 3505AAA is considered the highest grade while 9375 is a relatively lower grade.

Varieties

When sold as a variety of tea, gunpowder tea has several varieties:
Pingshui gunpowder: The original and most common variety of gunpowder tea with larger pearls, better color, and a more aromatic infusion, which is commonly sold as Temple of Heaven Gunpowder or Pinhead Gunpowder, the former being a common brand of this tea variety.
Formosa gunpowder: A gunpowder style tea grown in Taiwan near Keelung, it is claimed to have its own characteristic aroma, different from that of Zhejiang Province gunpowder grown in mainland China. Formosa gunpowder teas are typically fresh or roasted oolongs.

Several types of green teas are commonly rolled into "gunpowder" form, including Chunmee, Tieguanyin, Huang Guanyin, and Dong Ding, as well as many other oolong and higher-end jasmine teas.

Etymology
In Mandarin, gunpowder tea is called  (珠茶; literally 'pearl tea' or 'bead tea'; not to be confused with boba tea).

The origin of the English term may come from the tea's similarity in appearance to actual gunpowder: grayish, dark pellets of irregular shape used as explosive propellant for early guns. The name may also have arisen from the fact that the grey-green leaf is tightly rolled into a tiny pellet and "explodes" into a long leaf upon being steeped in hot water. Another explanation is that the tea can also have a smoky flavor.

It is also possible that the English term may stem from the Mandarin Chinese phrase for 'freshly brewed',  (剛泡的), which sounds like the English word gunpowder.

Brewing methods
While brewing methods vary widely by tea and individual preferences, 1 teaspoon of loose-leaf tea is recommended for every 150 ml (5.07 oz) of water. For the first and second brewing, leaves should be steeped for around one minute. It is also recommended that the tea cup or tea pot used be rinsed with hot water prior to brewing the tea to warm the vessels. When brewed, gunpowder tea is a yellow color.

Use in the Maghreb

Gunpowder tea is exported to the Maghreb where it is used in the preparation of traditional North African mint tea. The Moroccan tea ritual is at the heart of any social gathering, from an informal visit to a neighbor to lavish soirees with dignitaries. Mint tea is made by adding mint and sugar or honey to gunpowder tea while brewing.
It was later introduced to Algeria by the great Saharan Dynasty of the Ouled Sidi Cheikh, who adapted it from the Moroccans as a luxurious beverage.

References

Green tea
Chinese teas
Chinese tea grown in Zhejiang